Richard Mostyn is a Canadian politician, who was elected to the Legislative Assembly of Yukon in the 2016 election. He represents the electoral district of Whitehorse West as a member of the Yukon Liberal Party. He is currently the Minister of Highways and Public Works and the Public Service Commission.

Political career

Mostyn was elected on November 7, 2016, defeating high profile, three-term incumbent and Yukon Party Deputy Premier Elaine Taylor by just 22 votes. Taylor, at the time, was the longest-serving Cabinet minister in the Yukon and in Canada. Mostyn was elected as part of the incoming Yukon Liberal majority government of Sandy Silver.

On December 3, 2016, Mostyn was sworn into Cabinet as the Minister of Highways and Public Works and the Minister of the Public Service Commission. Mostyn is also currently a member of the Standing Committee on Rules, Elections and Privileges.

Personal life

He arrived in Yukon with his wife in 1989.

Prior to entering politics, Mostyn was a journalist and editor of the Yukon News. Throughout his career, he covered small business, politics, health, energy, technology, mining, the environment, and the arts. His career as a journalist spanned the administrations of Yukon Premiers Tony Penikett, John Ostashek, Piers McDonald, Pat Duncan, Dennis Fentie and Darrell Pasloski.

In the course of his career, he was published in The Globe and Mail, National Post, Vancouver Sun, and Up Here Magazine, and appeared on CBC Radio and TV and the BBC World Service.

After leaving journalism in 2011, Mostyn worked for the Canadian Parks and Wilderness Society and its campaign to champion the Peel Watershed land-use plan. In 2012, he joined the Yukon Workers’ Compensation Health and Safety Board before running for territorial politics.

Electoral record

2016 general election

|-

| Liberal
| Richard Mostyn
| align="right"| 455
| align="right"| 45.8%
| align="right"| +17.1%
|-

|-

| NDP
| Stu Clark
| align="right"| 106
| align="right"| 10.7%
| align="right"| -2.2%
|-
! align=left colspan=3|Total
! align=right| 994
! align=right| 100.0%
! align=right| –
|}

References

Yukon Liberal Party MLAs
Living people
Politicians from Whitehorse
21st-century Canadian politicians
Members of the Executive Council of Yukon
Year of birth missing (living people)